Marawa  is a town in the District of Jabal al Akhdar in north-eastern Libya, about 65 km south of Bayda. It is located on the cross-roads between the Marj-Lamluda inner road, and the Qasr Libya-Taban road.

References

External links
Satellite map at Maplandia.com

Populated places in Jabal al Akhdar